Theric Ruiz (born September 18, 1984) is an Aruban football player. He played for the Aruba national team.

National team statistics

References

1984 births
Living people
Aruban footballers
SV Deportivo Nacional players
SV Britannia players
Aruban Division di Honor players
Association football defenders
Aruba international footballers